Martin Óg Morrissey (born 1934 in Waterford, Ireland) was an Irish sportsperson.  He played hurling with his local club Mount Sion and with the Waterford senior inter-county team in the 1950s and 1960s.

Early life

Martin Óg Morrissey was born in Waterford in 1934.  He was educated locally at the famous Mount Sion School where his hurling skills were first developed.  Morrissey captained the Mount Sion school team to win the Dr. Harty Cup in 1953.

Playing career

Club

Morrissey played his club hurling with the famous Mount Sion club.

Inter-county

In 1957 Waterford reached the Munster final for the first time in almost a decade.  Cork provided the opposition on that occasion and were widely tipped to take the title.  Waterford, however, outplayed ‘the Rebels’ and took the title giving Morrissey his first Munster senior medal.  Waterford later defeated Galway in the All-Ireland semi-final, setting up a championship decider with Kilkenny.  With fifteen minutes left in the game Morrissey's side were leading ‘the Cats’ by six points, however, Kilkenny fought back to win the game by a point on a score line of 4–10 to 3–12.  In 1958 Waterford were classed as one-season wonders as they were trounced by Tipperary in the provincial championship.  Morrissey's side bounced back in 1959 by reaching the final of the National Hurling League.  Once again, Tipp had the upper hand and defeated Waterford.  In spite of this Waterford went on to defeat Cork in the provincial final, giving Morrissey a second Munster medal.  This victory allowed Waterford to advance to the All-Ireland final where Kilkenny provided the opposition once again.  The game is regarded as one of the all-time classics.  Waterford led by five points at the break; however, Kilkenny came back and led by a goal with time running out.  Just then Waterford's Séamus Power scored a goal for Waterford and the game ended in a draw.  The replay four weeks later began badly for Morrissey's side, however, Waterford came back into the game and outclassed Kilkenny.  The score line of 3–12 to 1-10 resulted in Morrissey collecting his first senior All-Ireland medal.  Waterford surrendered their provincial title the following year and went into declined.  In 1963 Morrissey's side defeated Munster rivals Tipperary and the exiles of New York to take the National league title.  The 'home final' of the league turned out to be the provincial final, with Waterford defeating Tipperary in a low-scoring game giving Morrissey his third Munster title.  The subsequent All-Ireland final saw Waterford square up to Kilkenny for the third time in seven years.  Once again, the game was regarded as a classic with 35 scores being recorded during the sixty minutes of play.  Waterford trailed at half-time; however, they fought back in the second-half.  The brilliance of Kilkenny's Ollie Walsh denied Waterford some more goals as Eddie Keher scored a record 0–14.  The final score of 4–17 to 6-8 gave Kilkenny the victory and brought an end to Waterford's greatest hurling era.

Morrissey retired from inter-county hurling shortly afterwards.

Honours

Waterford
All-Ireland Senior Hurling Championship:
Winner (1): 1959
Runner-up (2): 1957, 1963
Munster Senior Hurling Championship:
Winner (3): 1957, 1959, 1963
Runner-up (3): 1958, 1962, 1966
National Hurling League:
Winner (1): 1963
Runner-up (2): 1959, 1961,

Munster
Railway Cup:
Winner (4): 1958, 1959, 1960, 1961
Runner-up (1): 1962,

Teams

References

1934 births
Living people
Mount Sion hurlers
Waterford inter-county hurlers
Munster inter-provincial hurlers
All-Ireland Senior Hurling Championship winners